The Russian National Freestyle Wrestling Championships 2018 (also known as the Russian Nationals 2018) was held in Odintsovo, Moscow Oblast, Russia by the Russian Wrestling Federation at the Odintsovo Sport Complex from 3–5 August 2018.

Medal overview

Medal table

Men's freestyle

See also 

2017 Russian National Freestyle Wrestling Championships
2016 Russian National Freestyle Wrestling Championships
2015 Russian National Greco-Roman Wrestling Championships
Soviet and Russian results in men's freestyle wrestling

References 

Russian National Freestyle Wrestling Championships
Sport in Dagestan
2018 in sport wrestling
2018 in Russian sport
Wrestling